The 15th Infantry Brigade, later 15 (North East) Brigade, was an infantry brigade of the British Army. It was part of the regular 5th Infantry Division during the First World War and Second World War, and was subsequently part of the 2nd Infantry Division in the north of the United Kingdom, with specific responsibility for the areas of North East England and Yorkshire and the Humber.

History

Formation
The 15th Infantry Brigade was first formed in 1905 at Fermoy and up to the outbreak of the First World War continued to serve in Ireland. The Brigade, which at that time consisted of 1st Battalion, Norfolk Regiment, 1st Battalion, Dorset Regiment, 1st Battalion, Cheshire Regiment and 2nd Battalion, Highland Light Infantry, was mobilized on 5 August 1914 and crossed to France as part the 5th Division with the British Expeditionary Force.

First World War
During the opening months of the War, the Brigade had its full share of fighting and saw action at Mons, Le Cateau, at the crossings of the Marne and Aisne and in the first battles in Flanders.

The Brigade has chosen Ypres, November 1914, as the Brigade Battle and there is an annual Brigade Dinner to celebrate it. The Brigade fought in all four battles of Ypres.

The Brigade distinguished itself in various battles. One of the most notable was the attack on Hill 60 near Ypres in 1915. Hill 60 was the highest point on what was known as the "Caterpillar Ridge" and as such was an excellent post for observation of the ground area around Zillebeke and Ypres. The 5th Division, composed of 13th, 14th and 15th brigades, had the task of securing Hill 60 and the ridge line. The Hill was taken between 17 and 19 April 1915, with heavy losses, and the subsequent German counterattack in early May was particularly ferocious. The Germans, unable to obtain victory, eventually resorted to the use of chlorine gas and Brigade casualties during the first week in May 1915 were 33 officers and 1,553 men. However, the line was held until reliefs were brought forward and the Brigade withdrawn.

The last battle of the Great War in November 1918 found 15th Brigade in the forefront of the advance, east of the River Sambre.

Order of battle
 1st Battalion, Norfolk Regiment
 1st Battalion, Bedfordshire Regiment (to 1 Nov 1918)
 1st Battalion, Cheshire Regiment
 1st Battalion, Dorsetshire Regiment (to November 1915)
 1/6th Battalion, Cheshire Regiment (from 17 December 1914 to 1 Mar 1915)
 1/6th (Rifle) Battalion, King's Regiment (Liverpool) (from 27 February 1915 to 18 November 1915)
 16th (Service) Battalion, Royal Warwickshire Regiment (from 26 December 1915 to 4 October 1918)
 15th Machine Gun Company, Machine Gun Corps (formed 27 December 1915, moved to 5th Battalion, Machine Gun Corps 26 April 1918)
 15th Trench Mortar Battery (formed April 1916)

The Inter-War Years
Following the war the 15th Brigade returned to Belfast where it commanded 1st Battalion, Dorsetshire Regiment, 1st Battalion, Somerset Light Infantry, 1st Durham Light Infantry and 1st Battalion, King's Royal Rifle Corps. In 1924 the 15th Brigade moved to Germany as part of the British Army of the Rhine and was renamed 1st Rhine Brigade. The Brigade was reformed, as 15th Infantry Brigade in October.

Second World War

The brigade was formed from regular units on the outbreak of war on 3 September 1939. When the 5th Division was sent to France late 1939, the 15th Brigade was sent instead in May to Norway, as part of Sickleforce to participate in the unsuccessful Norwegian Campaign, under the command of Lieutenant-General H.R.S.Massey. The brigade was reunited with the 5th Division on 3 August.

The Brigade served with this formation for the rest of the war, seeing action in the Allied invasion of Sicily in July 1943 and Italian Campaign later in the year. After participating in the later stages of the Battle of Anzio, the brigade was deployed to garrison duties in the Middle East before being transferred to North-western Europe on 3 March 1945. The brigade was disbanded in Hanover on 31 March 1948.

Order of battle
 1st Battalion, Green Howards
 1st Battalion, King's Own Yorkshire Light Infantry
 1st Battalion, York and Lancaster Regiment

Reformation
The Brigade was reformed in 1982, as a Territorial Army formation, which in turn was part of the 2nd Infantry Division. The Brigade's Headquarters were at Alanbrooke Barracks and its first commander in this new role was Brigadier Michael Aris. Its organisation and role were tested in Exercise Keystone in 1983, when it consisted of:

 Queen's Own Yeomanry
 6th Battalion, Royal Regiment of Fusiliers
 7th Battalion, The Light Infantry
 1st Battalion, Yorkshire Volunteers
 2nd Battalion, Yorkshire Volunteers

In 1999, having been a territorial formation for many years, the brigade was made responsible for both regular and territorial units in the North East, when the Second Division became a "Regenerative Division", responsible for the north of England and Scotland.

This brigade was merged with the former 4th Mechanised Brigade to become the Headquarters North East section of 4th Infantry Brigade and Headquarters North East based in Catterick.

Role and Structure
In 1989 the 15th Infantry Brigade, (at that time a Reserve Brigade), had the following structure
Structure 1989:

 HQ 15th Infantry Brigade and Signal Troop, Royal Signals (V)
 Queen's Own Yeomanry (V)
 1st (Cleavland) Battalion, Yorkshire Volunteers (V)
 2nd (Yorkshire and Humberside) Battalion, Yorkshire Volunteers (V)
 6th Battalion, Royal Regiment of Fusiliers (V)
 7th (Durham) Battalion, The Light Infantry (V)
 8th (Yorkshire) Battalion, The Light Infantry (V)
 101st (Northumbrian) Field Regiment, Royal Artillery (V)
 269th (West Riding) Observation Post Battery, Royal Artillery (V)

15th (North East) Brigade was a Regional Brigade responsible for the recruiting of soldiers and Officers for the Regular and Territorial Army. It trained the Territorial Army for operations, provided a command and control focus for all military support to civilian authorities during civil emergencies e.g. flooding and was responsible for providing the "Firm Base" to the Regular Army within its area. The brigade had its headquarters at Imphal Barracks in York and included the following units:

 Queen's Own Yeomanry (Formation Reconnaissance)
 4th Battalion, Yorkshire Regiment (14th/15th, 19th & 33rd/76th Foot)
 5th Battalion, Royal Regiment of Fusiliers
 72nd Engineer Regiment, Royal Engineers
 150th (Yorkshire) Transport Regiment, Royal Logistic Corps
 102nd Battalion, Royal Electrical and Mechanical Engineers

Commanders
The following officers commanded the 15th Brigade during its existence:
 Brigadier-General Richard L. Payne: July 1905-March 1907
 Brigadier-General Vesey J. Dawson: March 1907-April 1908
 Major-General Alexander Wilson: April 1908-August 1911
 Brigadier-General Count Gleichen: August 1911-March 1915
 Brigadier-General Edward Northey: March-June 1915
 Brigadier-General Martin N. Turner: June 1915-November 1917
 Brigadier-General Richard D. F. Oldman: November 1917-1919
 Brigadier-General George T. C. Carter-Campbell: November 1919-July 1921
 Colonel-Commandant Herbert C. Potter: July 1921-December 1922
 Colonel-Commandant Sir Percy C. B. Skinner: December 1922-1923
 Colonel-Commandant Bertram N. Sergison-Brooke: April-December 1927
 Brigadier Charles E. Heathcote: December 1929-April 1932
 Brigadier George C. Kelly: April 1932-October 1934
 Brigadier Archibald B. Beauman: October 1934-October 1938
 Brigadier Henry B. D. Willcox: October 1938-January 1939 
 Brigadier Horatio P. M. Berney-Ficklin: July 1939-22 April 1940
 Brigadier H. E. F. Smyth: 22–25 April 1940
 Lieutenant-Colonel A. L. Kent-Lemon: 25 April – 25 May 1940 (acting)
 Brigadier H. P. M. Berney-Ficklin: 25 May – 20 June 1940
 Lieutenant-Colonel A. E. Robinson: 20–22 June 1940 (acting)
 Brigadier J. A. H. Gammell: 22 June – 23 July 1940
 Brigadier Hector R. N. Greenfield: 25 July 1940 – 8 March 1943
 Brigadier George S. Rawstorne: 8 March – 19 August 1943
 Brigadier E. Owen Martin: 19 August 1943 – 22 January 1944
 Brigadier John Y. Whitfield: 22 January – 29 April 1944
 Lieutenant-Colonel P. St Clair-Ford: 29 April – 6 May 1944 (acting)
 Brigadier J. Y. Whitfield: 6 May – 2 July 1944
 Lieutenant Colonel P. St Clair-Ford: 2–13 July 1944 (acting)
 Brigadier Christopher Huxley: 13 July 1944 – 21 June 1945
 Brigadier David Russell Morgan: 21 June 1945 – October 1946
 Brigadier James F. S. McLaren: October 1946-June 1947
 Brigadier Richard W. Goodbody: June 1947-January 1948
 Brigadier Michael A. Aris: January 1982-November 1984
 Brigadier Peter S. Morton: November 1984-April 1987
 Brigadier Timothy D. V. Bevan: April 1987-January 1990
 Brigadier Anthony de C. L. Leask: January 1990-December 1991 
 Brigadier Christopher J. Marchant-Smith: December 1991-December 1994 
 Brigadier J.Austin Thorp: December 1994-July 1997
 Brigadier Alan P. Deed: July 1997-June 2000
 Brigadier Andrew P. Farquhar: June 2000-September 2002
 Brigadier David A. H. Shaw: September 2002-August 2004
 Brigadier Richard W. Dennis: August 2004-January 2008
 Brigadier David J. H. Maddan: January 2008-December 2010
 Brigadier Greville K. Bibby CBE: January 2011-December 2014

References

External links
 15 (North East) Brigade – on British Army official website
 Orders of Battle
 Yorkshire Volunteers Official Website
 History of 15 Infantry Brigade

Infantry brigades of the British Army
Infantry brigades of the British Army in World War I
15
Military units and formations established in 1914
Military units and formations disestablished in 2014